Edward Southwell Garnier (5 April 1850 – 8 August 1938) was an English first-class cricketer and clergyman.

Early life and background 
Garnier was born in April 1850 at Paddington, the son of Thomas Garnier (1809-1863) and Lady Caroline Keppel (1814-1898). His father was Dean of Lincoln, and his mother was the youngest daughter of William Keppel, 4th Earl of Albemarle. 

His brother Thomas was also a first-class cricketer.

Education and cricket career 
He was educated at Marlborough College, before matriculating at University College, Oxford in 1869, graduating B.A. in 1873 and M.A. in 1876. While studying at Oxford, he played first-class cricket for Oxford University, making his debut against the Marylebone Cricket Club at Oxford in 1871. He played first-class cricket for Oxford until 1873, making ten appearances. He scored a total of 187 runs in his ten matches, at an average of 11.68 and a high score of 66 not out.

He also played below first-class at county level for Bedfordshire and, on one occasion in 1871, for Shropshire while playing at club level for Ludlow.

Career outside sport
After graduating from Oxford, Garnier took holy orders in the Church of England, training at Wells Theological College. He was ordained deacon in 1874 and priest in 1875 by the Bishop of Ely. After serving as curate at Aspley Guise (1874-77) and Biggleswade (1877-78), his first ecclesiastical posting was as rector of Titsey, Surrey from 1878–83, before becoming the rector of Quidenham, Norfolk, where he served until retiring in 1926, also being Rural Dean of North and South Rockland in 1914. He was an honorary canon of Norwich Cathedral from 1922. 

Garnier died in Norfolk at Shropham in August 1938.

References

External links

1850 births
1938 deaths
People from Paddington
People educated at Marlborough College
Alumni of University College, Oxford
English cricketers
Oxford University cricketers
19th-century English Anglican priests
20th-century English Anglican priests